Isuzu Commercial Truck of America, Inc. (ICTA) is the North American subsidiary of Isuzu Motors. It is headquartered in Anaheim, California. Isuzu commercial trucks have been the #1 selling low cab forward trucks in America every year since 1986.

History

1984–1990 
ICTA was established on March 21, 1984. The first KS22 truck arrived at the Port of Jacksonville, Florida on November 10, 1984.In 1985 ICTA imported 1,300 more KS22 trucks.

According to R.L. Polk & Company registration data, Isuzu became the best-selling low cab forward in the United States in 1986. R.L. Polk & Company statistics reported Isuzu-built trucks then dominated 30% of the U.S market in 1989.

1991–2000
On February 9, 1991, the first American-built gas engine NPR was built in Jainesville, WI.

2001–2010
In April 2005, the 50,000th gas truck was built in Janesville.

On April 17, 2007, Isuzu Commercial Truck of Canada, Inc. (ICTC) was incorporated.

2011–present
In 2011, Charlotte, Michigan began producing gas trucks.

In 2012, the Isuzu Reach was named Medium-Duty Truck of the Year, and in 2013, the Isuzu N-Series was named Medium-Duty Truck of the Year 

In 2014, Isuzu Commercial Truck of America, Inc. restored the very first KS22 truck sold for the 30th anniversary.

References 

Isuzu